Rhea Haines (October 2, 1894 – March 12, 1964) was a silent film actress from Indiana.

Biography
Haines was a leading lady for the film company of actor Hobart Bosworth. She played in films with Lillian Gish, Dorothy Gish, and Mack Sennett. In 1920 she appeared in Mary Ellen Comes to Town and Always Audacious for Paramount Pictures. The same year she performed in The Master Stroke for Vitagraph and Smiling All The Way for D.N. Schwab. In 1921 Haines made Uncharted Seas for Metro Pictures.

In Mary Ellen Comes To Town, she appeared with Dorothy Gish, Ralph Graves, and Charles Gerrard. The film was directed by Elmer Clifton.

She was associated as an actress with both D.W. Griffith and the Fine Arts Theater. Haines stopped making motion pictures in the early 1920s. She was married to attorney Thomas Case.

She died in Los Angeles, California, in 1964, aged 69, from undisclosed causes.

Partial filmography
 John Barleycorn (1914)
 An Odyssey of the North (1914)
 Burning Daylight: The Adventures of 'Burning Daylight' in Alaska (1914)
 The Pursuit of the Phantom (1914)
 The Country Mouse (1914)
 Buckshot John (1915)
 Little Sunset (1915)
 The Beachcomber (1915)
 The Chalice of Sorrow (1916)
 Nina, the Flower Girl (1917)
 Hands Up! (1917)
 The Man from Painted Post (1917)
 Turning the Tables (1919)
 Scarlet Days (1919)
 A Master Stroke (1920)
 Runnin' Straight (1920)
 Mary Ellen Comes to Town (1920)
 Always Audacious (1920)
 Uncharted Seas (1921)

References
Los Angeles Times, "The Screen", March 22, 1920, Page 12.
Los Angeles Times, "Services Set for Actress Rhea Haines", March 14, 1964, Page B2.

External links

1894 births
1964 deaths
American film actresses
American silent film actresses
Actresses from Indiana
20th-century American actresses